Lipocosma albibasalis is a moth in the family Crambidae. It is found from Costa Rica to coastal Brazil.

The ground colour of the forewings is white with pale brown fasciae and lines.

References

Glaphyriinae
Moths described in 1906